Charles Livingston Bull (1874–1932) was an American illustrator.  Bull studied taxidermy in Rochester, New York and is known for his illustration of wildlife.

Career
Bull's first job at the age of 16 was preparing animals for mounting at the Ward's Museum in Rochester, New York. He later worked as a taxidermist in Washington, D.C specializing in anatomy of birds and animals.

During World War I, he designed recruiting posters.  A notable example is Join the Army Air Service.  Be an American eagle! which featured an eagle fighting a black bird.

Bull lived for many years near the Bronx Zoo in New York to allow close access to be able to sketch living animals.  He made many trips to Central and South America studying wildlife in their natural surrounding.  Stories and illustrations for this trip were published in his book, Under the Roof of the Jungle.  He made many drawings to help garner public interest in eagles.

Bull was a resident of Oradell, New Jersey and donated several of his works to the Oradell Public Library.

Gallery

See also
Animal Fairy Tales
William J. Long
Charles G.D. Roberts
National Museum of American Illustration

References

Bibliography

External links

 
 
 
 Charles Livingston Bull biography artwork at AskART.com
 

1874 births
1932 deaths
American illustrators
People from Oradell, New Jersey